Charlotte Grady Roxborough (September 8, 1887 – 1970) was a singer, dancer, and comedian who performed in theatrical productions and vaudeville as well as films. She was born to Wesley, a white father & Susan (Kelly) Grady. She performed at the Pekin Theatre in Chicago where she was a star member of its stock company. She starred in William Foster's “The Pullman Porter,” in 1912, the first black motion picture production.

She was born in Chicago. Her photograph ran in a 1909 edition of the New York Age. She was described as well known and lauded for her performances in reviews.

She married Charles Roxborough, a lawyer who served in the Michigan Senate. Then divorced. She ran a saloon in Idlewild, Michigan.

Theater
The Merry Widower (musical) (1908)
Mr. Lode of Koal (1909)
Broadway Rastus (show)

Filmography
The Railroad Porter/ The Pullman Porter (1912)
The Grafter and the Girl (1913)

References

External links
Photo of her on songsheet cover along with her bio from IMDb
Findagrave entry

1887 births
1970 deaths